Dihydrokanakugiol is a dihydrochalcone isolated from Lindera lucida.

References

Dihydrochalcones